Alex Davies (born 20 June 1986) is an English rugby union player and coach at Rosslyn Park. Davies can play at either fly half or scrum half.

Davies set points records for Plymouth Albion kicking a record-breaking seven penalties in Plymouth’s 35-24 relegation play-off victory over Birmingham & Solihull R.F.C. and previously in the season equalled the south coast club’s record for most points in a league match by scoring 26 points against the same opposition at Damson Park before joining London Welsh in July 2011.

Davies played for London Welsh for four years, twice winning promotion to the Premiership and making thirty six Guinness Premiership appearances before spending two years at Ealing Trailfinders and two at Yorkshire Carnegie. In May 2018 Davies was confirmed as signing for Bath.

Davies left Bath in July 2020 to become a player coach at Rosslyn Park in National League 1.

References

1986 births
Bath Rugby players
Living people
London Welsh RFC players
Ealing Trailfinders Rugby Club players
Plymouth Albion R.F.C. players
People from Chester
Lancashire County RFU players
Rugby union scrum-halves